The 2009 Aegon Championships (also known traditionally as the Queen's Club Championships) was a tennis tournament played on outdoor grass courts. It was the 107th edition of the event and was part of the ATP World Tour 250 series of the 2009 ATP World Tour. It took place at the Queen's Club in London, United Kingdom, from 8–14 June 2009.

The singles draw was headlined by Association of Tennis Professionals (ATP) World Tour Number 3, US Open and Indian Wells runner-up, Doha, Rotterdam and Miami champion Andy Murray, Memphis winner, Australian Open semifinalist and four-time Queen's Club champion Andy Roddick, and Australian Open quarterfinalist Gilles Simon. Also present were Acapulco runner-up, French Open quarterfinalist Gaël Monfils, Chennai and Zagreb winner Marin Čilić, James Blake, Marat Safin and Mardy Fish.

The doubles draw was led by reigning Wimbledon champions, Rotterdam, Monte Carlo, Barcelona, Rome and Madrid winners Daniel Nestor and Nenad Zimonjić. Other seeded partnerships were 2008 US Open and 2009 Australian Open champions Bob Bryan and Mike Bryan, Bruno Soares and Kevin Ullyett, and Mariusz Fyrstenberg and Marcin Matkowski.

Finals

Singles

 Andy Murray defeated  James Blake, 7–5, 6–4
It was Murray's 4th title of the year and 12th of his career. It was his first of five Queen's Club Championships titles.

Doubles

 Wesley Moodie /  Mikhail Youzhny defeated  Marcelo Melo /  André Sá, 6–4, 4–6, [10–6]

Entrants

Seeds

* Seedings are based on the rankings as of 25 May 2009

Other entrants
The following players received wildcards into the main draw:

  Joshua Goodall
  Sébastien Grosjean
  James Ward
  Marcos Baghdatis
  Grigor Dimitrov

The following players received entry from the qualifying draw:

  Kevin Anderson
  Xavier Malisse
  Nicolas Mahut
  Sergiy Stakhovsky

References

External links
Official website AEGON Championships 
The Queen's Club website
ATP tournament profile
Singles draw
Doubles draw

 
Aegon Championships
Queen's Club Championships
Aegon Championships
Aegon Championships
Aegon Championships